Zhang Xiaoniang (11th-century), was a Chinese physician. She is known as one of the famous four female physicians in Chinese history, along with Yi Jia of Western Han dynasty, Gu Bao of the Jin dynasty and Tan Yunxian, who was active during the Ming dynasty.   She was active during the reign of Emperor Renzong of Song.

References 

11th-century births
11th-century deaths
11th-century Chinese women
11th-century Chinese people
11th-century Chinese physicians
Medieval women physicians